Nanorana arunachalensis is a species of frog in the family Ranidae that is found in streams of Lower Subansiri district, Arunachal Pradesh, India. The presence of black mark between this frog's eyes separate it from other frog species in this genus.

References

arunachalensis
Amphibians described in 2017
Amphibians of India